Pine oil is an essential oil obtained from a variety of species of pine, particularly Pinus sylvestris. Typically, parts of the trees that are not used for lumber - stumps, etc. - are ground and subjected to steam distillation. As of 1995, synthetic pine oil was the "biggest single turpentine derivative." Synthetic pine oils accounted for 90% of sales as of 2000.

Composition
Pine oil is a higher boiling fraction from turpentine. Both synthetic and natural pine oil consists mainly of α-terpineol, a C10 alcohol (b.p. 214–217 °C).   The detailed composition of natural pine oil depends on many factors, such as the species of the host plant.  Synthetic pine oil is obtained by treating pinene with water in the presence of a catalytic amount of sulfuric acid.  This treatment results in hydration of the alkene and rearrangement of the pinene skeleton, yielding terpineols.

Uses
Industrially, pine oil was once used in froth flotation for the separation of mineral from ores.  For example, in copper extraction, pine oil is used to condition copper sulfide ores for froth flotation. 

It is also used as a lubricant in small and expensive clockwork instruments. 

In alternative medicine it is used in aromatherapy and as a scent in bath oils.

Properties as a disinfectant 
Pine oil is used  as a cleaning product, disinfectant, sanitizer, microbicide (or microbistat), virucide or insecticide. It is an effective herbicide where its action is to modify the waxy cuticle of plants, resulting in desiccation. Pine oil is a disinfectant that is mildly antiseptic.  It is effective against Brevibacterium ammoniagenes, the fungi Candida albicans, Enterobacter aerogenes, Escherichia coli, Gram-negative enteric bacteria, household germs, Gram-negative household germs such as those causing salmonellosis, herpes simplex types 1 and 2, influenza type A, influenza virus type A/Brazil, influenza virus type A2/Japan, intestinal bacteria, Klebsiella pneumoniae, odor-causing bacteria, mold, mildew, Pseudomonas aeruginosa, Salmonella choleraesuis, Salmonella typhi, Salmonella typhosa, Serratia marcescens, Shigella sonnei, Staphylococcus aureus, Streptococcus faecalis, Streptococcus pyogenes, and Trichophyton mentagrophytes.

Safety 
Pine oil has a relatively low human toxicity level, a low corrosion level and limited persistence; however, it irritates the skin and mucous membranes and has been known to cause breathing problems.  Large doses may cause central nervous system depression.

See also 
 List of cleaning products
 Pine-Sol, cleaning product that originally contained pine oil, though it switched to a different active ingredient in 2013 due to the declining availability of pine oil

References

Further reading 
 
 

Aromatherapy
Disinfectants
Essential oils